Originally developed and produced by Minolta as AF Apo Tele Zoom 70-200mm 2.8 G (D) SSM, then marketed by Sony as 70-200mm 2.8 G SSM (SAL-70200G) and updated as 70-200mm 2.8 G SSM II (SAL-70200G2), this lens is a professional full-frame lens compatible with cameras using the Minolta, Konica Minolta and Sony A-mount.

See also
 List of Minolta A-mount lenses

Sources
Dyxum lens data

External links
Sony: SAL-70200G: 70-200mm F2.8 G

70-200